Marguerite Donlon (born 31 May 1966) is an Irish dancer, choreographer and ballet director.

Career 
Marguerite Donlon was born in County Longford, Republic of Ireland. After a childhood of traditional Irish dance, Marguerite began her ballet studies with Anica Louw and Dorothy Stevens at the late age of 16.  She became a soloist and choreographer with the dance company of the Deutsche Oper Berlin in 1990; before that she was a member of the English National Ballet under Peter Schaufuss.  During this time she worked with and was coached by many world-renowned artists, including Natalia Makarova, Rudolf Nureyev, Kenneth MacMillan, and danced pieces from choreographers such as Maurice Béjart, William Forsythe, Bill T. Jones, Meg Stuart and Jiří Kylián.

She was director of the ballet at the Saarländisches Staatstheater between 2001 and 2013.

Awards 
 2007 Nomination for the Prix Benois (Giselle: Reloaded)
 2007 Nomination for the German theatre prize Der Faust (Romeo und Julia)
 2007 Award: Saarländischer Verdienstorden

Selected works

References

General references

External links
 Official site

1966 births
Living people
Irish female dancers
Ballet choreographers
Irish choreographers
People from County Longford
Recipients of the Saarland Order of Merit